Munehiro (written: 宗弘 or 宗広) is a masculine Japanese given name. Notable people with the name include:

, Japanese samurai and writer
, Japanese decathlete
, Japanese military figure

Other uses
MUNEHIRO, the name used by the Japanese actress Sarina Suzuki when recording as a reggae artist

Japanese masculine given names